Sayyid (also spelt Saiyed, Seyit, Seyd, Syed, Sayed, Sayyed, Saiyid, Seyed, al-Sayyed and Seyyed) (meaning 'Lord', 'Master'; plural: Sadat   is a masculine name given to descendants of the Islamic prophet Muhammad. It is not to be confused with Sa‘id (or Saeed).

Given name
 Said Alam, Pakistani pediatric surgeon and political activist
 Saif Khan Barha, Chief of Sayyeds of Barha in Jahangir's time
 Sayed Awad, Egyptian composer
 Sayed Darwish, Egyptian singer
 Sayed Gouda, Egyptian poet
 Sayed Haider, Bangladeshi physician and Language Movement activist
 Sayed Moawad, Egyptian footballer
 Sayed Mosaad, Egyptian footballer
 Sayed Yusuf, Indian field hockey player
 Sayyid Qutb, Egyptian pan-Islamist
 Sayyed Mahmud Khan, Great and powerful general in Akbar's army
 Syed Abul Maksud, Bangladeshi writer and columnist
 Syed Ahmed Khan, Indian educator and politician
 Syed Ahmed, British Bangladeshi entrepreneur
 Syed Farid, Indian footballer
 Syed Faruk, Singaporean football manager
 Syed Hussain, Indian politician
 Syed Ibrahim, Indian Sufi
 Syed Kirmani, Indian cricketer
 Syed Mahmud, Indian politician
 Syed Manzoorul Islam, Bangladeshi author
 Syed Masood, fictional character, mispronounced as Sa‘id
 Syed Mujtaba Ali, Bengali author
 Syed Nomanul Haq, Pakistani historian of philosophy and science
 Syed Rashid Ali, Danish cricketer
 Syed Saddiq Syed Abdul Rahman, Malaysian politician
 Syed Sadequain Ahmed Naqvi, Pakistani artist referred to as Sadequain
 Syed Shamsul Haque, Bangladeshi poet
 Syed Sheh Hassan Barakbah, Malaysian judge
 Syed Yazid, Malaysian unionist
 Syed Ziaur Rahman, Indian scientist & pharmacologist

Surname
 Ahmad al-Sayyed, Syrian politician
G. M. Syed, Pakistani politician
 Khalid Al-Sayyid, Lebanese actor and voice actor
 Mohamed Elsayed, Egyptian boxer
 Nader El-Sayed, Egyptian footballer
 Shahi Sayed, Pakistani politician

See also
Syed Ali, a related name, including a list of people with this name

References

Arabic-language surnames
Arabic masculine given names